The 109th Brigade was a formation of  the British Army during the First World War. It was raised as part of the new army also known as Kitchener's Army and assigned to the 36th (Ulster) Division. The brigade served on the Western Front.

Formation 
The infantry battalions did not all serve at once, but all were assigned to the brigade during the war.
9th Battalion, Royal Inniskilling Fusiliers (County Tyrone)
10th Battalion, Royal Inniskilling Fusiliers (County Londonderry)
11th Battalion, Royal Inniskilling Fusiliers (County Donegal and County Fermanagh) 
14th Battalion, Royal Irish Rifles (Young Citizens)
109th Machine Gun Company
109th Trench Mortar Battery
1st Battalion, Royal Inniskilling Fusiliers
2nd Battalion, Royal Inniskilling Fusiliers

References 

Infantry brigades of the British Army in World War I
Pals Brigades of the British Army